CD-142 or No. 142 was a Type D escort ship of the Imperial Japanese Navy during World War II.

History
She was laid down in 1944 at the Senshu shipyard of  Kawasaki Ship Building Company, Ltd. for the benefit of the Imperial Japanese Navy and launched on 8 May 1945. Although Japan announced their unconditional surrender on 15 August 1945, work continued on her and she was completed on 7 April 1946. She was assigned to the Allied Repatriation Service and completed a number of repatriation trips before being ceded to Soviet Union as a war reparation on 28 August 1947. 

She served as target ship EK-38 (ЭК-38) in the Soviet Pacific Ocean Fleet. In June 1949, she was re-designated as a dispatch ship and renamed Arkhara (Архара). In November 1954, she was re-designated a patrol boat and renamed СКР-48 (SKR-48). In February 1955, she was transferred to the Peoples Liberation Army Navy, under the name Chih-17 where she served until 1987.

References

Bibliography

1945 ships
Ships built by Kawasaki Heavy Industries
Type D escort ships
Ships of the Soviet Navy
Ships of the People's Liberation Army Navy